Elections to Liverpool City Council were held on 11 May 1961.

After the election, the composition of the council was:

One Conservative Aldermanic vacancy following the death of C. G. S. Gordon.

Election result

Ward results

* - Councillor seeking re-election

(PARTY) - Party of former Councillor

The Councillors seeking re-election at this election were elected in 1958 for a three-year term, therefore comparisons are made with the 1958 election results.

Abercromby

Aigburth

Allerton

Anfield

Arundel

Breckfield

Broadgreen

Central

Childwall

Church

Clubmoor

County

Croxteth

Dingle

Dovecot

Everton

Fairfield

Fazakerley

Gillmoss

Granby

Kensington

Low Hill

Melrose

Netherfield

Old Swan

Picton

Pirrie

Prince's Park

Sandhills

St. Domingo

St. James

St. Mary's

St. Michael's

Smithdown

Speke

Tuebrook

Vauxhall

Warbreck

Westminster

Woolton

Aldermanic elections
At the meeting of the City Council on 24 May 1961 the terms of office of twenty of the forty Aldermen expired and the Councillors elected twenty Aldermen to fill the vacant positions for a term of six years. Eighteen of the twenty retiring Labour Aldermen were replaced with Conservatives.

 Returned Alderman

References

1961
Liverpool City Council election
City Council election, 1961
Liverpool City Council election